Jacques Robert Fresco  (May 30, 1928 - December 5, 2021) was an American biochemist.

Fresco earned a dual chemistry and biology bachelor's degree from New York University, completed a master's degree in biology followed by a doctorate in biochemistry. Prior to joining the Princeton University faculty in 1960, he worked for the American Heart Association. Fresco was awarded a Guggenheim Fellowship in 1968, and retired from Princeton as Damon B. Pfeiffer Professor in the Life Sciences, Emeritus.

References

1928 births
2021 deaths
New York University alumni
Princeton University faculty
21st-century American biochemists
20th-century American biochemists